Tyger River Correctional Institution  is a medium-security state prison for men located in Enoree, Spartanburg County, South Carolina, owned and operated by the South Carolina Department of Corrections.  

The facility was opened in 1980 and has a capacity of 1160 inmates held at medium security.

References

Prisons in South Carolina
Buildings and structures in Spartanburg County, South Carolina
1980 establishments in South Carolina